An afterpiece is a short, usually humorous one-act playlet or musical work following the main attraction, the full-length play, and concluding the theatrical evening. This short comedy, farce, opera or pantomime was a popular theatrical form in the 18th and 19th centuries. It was presented to lighten the five-act tragedy that was commonly performed.

A similar piece preceding the main attraction is a curtain raiser.

An example is The Padlock by Charles Dibdin, first performed in London in 1768.

Notes

Theatrical genres
Opera genres